James Mackinlay was a rugby union international who represented England from 1872 to 1875.

Early life
James Mackinlay was born on 17 December 1850 in Guildford. He attended Oxford University and went on to study medicine at St. George's Hospital Medical School.

Rugby union career
Mackinlay made his international debut on 5 February 1872 at The Oval in the England vs Scotland match.
Of the three matches he played for his national side he was on the winning side on two occasions.
He played his final match for England on 15 February 1875 at The Oval in the England vs Ireland match.

References

1850 births
1917 deaths
Alumni of the University of Oxford
England international rugby union players
English rugby union players
Rugby union forwards
Rugby union players from Guildford